was a low-cost airline based on the grounds of Fukuoka Airport in Hakata-ku, Fukuoka, Fukuoka Prefecture, Japan and a wholly owned subsidiary of All Nippon Airways (ANA). It operated domestic services from its main base at Fukuoka Airport.   On October 1, 2010, Air Next, Air Central and Air Nippon Network were merged and rebranded as ANA Wings.

History
The airline was established in August 2004 and its first flight was on June 1, 2005 with a pair of Boeing 737-500 aircraft. Air Next received two more 737s by the end of 2006 and another three in 2007, bringing their fleet to a total of seven aircraft.

In February 2005 Air Next was headquartered in Minato, Tokyo.

Air Next aircraft carried ANA livery with the name "Air Next" in small letters on the fuselage and a dolphin painted on each engine. Flights were operated with ANA/NH flight numbers, although Air Next had its own airline codes.

Destinations
Fukuoka - Komatsu
Fukuoka - Ishigaki
Naha - Miyako
Naha - Ishigaki

Fleet
As of December 2009, the Air Next fleet included the following aircraft:

References

External links
Air Next
 

Defunct airlines of Japan
All Nippon Airways
Airlines established in 2004
Airlines disestablished in 2010
Fukuoka
Companies based in Fukuoka Prefecture
Former Star Alliance affiliate members
Japanese companies established in 2004
Japanese companies disestablished in 2010